Sturgeon River may refer to any of the following streams in the U.S. state of Michigan:

 A post office named Sturgeon River opened near the mouth of the river on July 23, 1891. The name was changed to St. Jacques on June 22, 1904. It closed on November 30, 1913, re-opened April 11, 1919, and was discontinued on July 31, 1955.

 Sturgeon River (Cheboygan County, Michigan) — The Sturgeon River rises in Otsego County near Gaylord and flows into Burt Lake in the community of Indian River.

References 

Rivers of Michigan
Set index articles on rivers of Michigan